Air Commodore Duncan le Geyt Pitcher,  (31 August 1877 – 1 September 1944) was an infantry and cavalry officer in the British Indian Army. During the First World War he served in the Royal Flying Corps and in his later years became a senior commander in the Royal Air Force.

Early years
Pitcher was born in Naini Tal in Uttarakhand (then called the East Indies), the son of Major Duncan Pitcher and his wife Rose. His father was on active service with the Bengal Staff Corps of the British Indian Army. At the time of the 1881 Census the family are living in Hendon, North London. In the 1891 Census Pitcher is a 13-year-old scholar at the Sedbergh School in Yorkshire.

Military aviation
Pitcher was sent from India to the Central Flying School in Great Britain in order to learn how to fly and gain the requisite knowledge to set up a flying school in India.  The European War broke out before he could return to India and Pitcher became involved in military aviation in Europe.

Pitcher attended the Central Flying School as a pilot under training in 1913 and once he had completed his course, he remained on the staff until the summer of 1914 when he was attached to No 4. Squadron RFC. He returned to the Central Flying School, probably in late 1914 and was appointed Officer In-charge of Transport. Immediately following the New Year of 1915, Pitcher took up instructional duties before being appointed a squadron commander at the Central Flying School in late January. In April 1915 he was appointed Assistant Commandant at the Central Flying School in which capacity he served until mid November 1915. Pitcher then spent around a month as a Royal Flying Corps wing commander before returning to the Central Flying School as its Commandant when Godfrey Paine returned to naval duties at Cranwell.

The 1 April 1916 saw Pitcher promoted and appointed Brigadier-General Commanding the I Brigade. In 1915 he recommended A. M. Low in WWI for work on the radio control systems for unmanned ‘Aerial Target' aircraft and then in 1918, for the remote control Distance Control Boats.

In 1921 Duncan was the best man at his old RFC colleague Robert Loraine’s wedding.

References

External links
Air of Authority – A History of RAF Organisation – Air Commodore D le G Pitcher

|-
 

|-

|-

|-
 

|-

1877 births
1944 deaths
People from Nainital
British Army generals of World War I
Commanders of the Order of the British Empire
Companions of the Distinguished Service Order
Companions of the Order of St Michael and St George
Officers of the Order of Saints Maurice and Lazarus
Officiers of the Légion d'honneur
People educated at Sedbergh School
Royal Air Force generals of World War I
Royal Flying Corps officers
Indian Army cavalry generals of World War I